Ali Asan-e Amiri (also Romanized as ‘Ali Āsān-e Amīrī; also known as ‘Ali Āsān, ‘Alī Eḩsān, ‘Alī Eḩsān-e Ojāq, Amīrī, Elyāsān-e Amīrī, Elyasané Amjadi, and Elyāsān-e Soflá) is a village in Agahan Rural District, Kolyai District, Sonqor County, Kermanshah Province, Iran. At the 2006 census, its population was 103, in 22 families.

References 

Populated places in Sonqor County